The Tired Sun is debut EP by New Zealand band Able Tasmans, released on Flying Nun Records in 1985.

Track listing

Side A
Patrick's Mother
Rain In Tulsa
Tom Song
Side B
Snow White Chook
Nelson The Cat
Rhyme For Orange

References

Able Tasmans albums
1987 EPs
Flying Nun Records EPs